Washington–Willow Historic District is a residential neighborhood of Fayetteville, Arkansas containing over one hundred historically and architecturally significant homes. Styles range from those popular in the mid-19th century through present day, predominantly Victorian, Italianate, neoclassical, and craftsman bungalows. Historically, Fayetteville leaders in business, law and education have all called the district home. The homes sit at the foot of East Mountain within the Masonic Addition, the first addition platted following incorporation.

The primary streets within the district are the namesake Washington Avenue and Willow Avenue, crossing Davidson Street, Maple Street, Lafayette Street, and Dickson Street. The district was listed on the National Register of Historic Places in 1980, and its boundaries were increased in 1995.

Structures
Although 105 structures were listed as "primary structures" on the initial 1980 submission, nineteen structures were listed to have special significance.

Headquarters House

Headquarters House, located at 118 East Dickson Street, is a historic house within the Washington–Willow Historic District in Fayetteville, Arkansas. The most historically significant structure in the city, it was built in 1853 and used as a base of operations for both the Union and Confederate States of America at different periods during the American Civil War. The house was the point of contention during the Battle of Fayetteville, which took place at the nearby intersection of College Avenue and Dickson Street. Headquarters House was listed on the National Register of Historic Places in 1971, prior to the designation of the Washington–Willow Historic District.

During the siege on April 18, 1863, the Union-occupied structure sustained damage from a Confederate cannonball striking the front door. The Union ultimately repelled the attack and was able to maintain control of northwest Arkansas.

A one-story weatherboard structure with fluted columns surrounding a central portico, the Headquarters House has significant elements of the Greek Revival style. The corners of the building possess decorative pilasters with transom and small sidelights adjacent to the doorway. The building was donated to the Washington County Historical Society as a museum in 1967, a function it has maintained ever since.

Significant structures

Homes adding to the character of the district

See also

 National Register of Historic Places listings in Washington County, Arkansas
 Mount Nord Historic District
 Wilson Park Historic District

References

National Register of Historic Places in Fayetteville, Arkansas
Historic districts on the National Register of Historic Places in Arkansas
Houses in Fayetteville, Arkansas